Menlo Park Mall is a two-level super regional shopping mall, located on U.S. Route 1 and Parsonage Road in Edison, New Jersey. Menlo Park Mall is currently owned and managed by Simon Property Group. Anchors are Macy's and Nordstrom. Other tenants include Barnes & Noble Booksellers and AMC Dine-In Menlo Park 12.

History
The Menlo Park Shopping Center opened in September 1959, as an open-air complex. It was developed and constructed by Abraham Sommer and Sigmund Sommer, developers from Iselin, New Jersey. It was named after the Menlo Park area of Edison, also the site of Thomas Edison's former laboratory location. The structure was fully enclosed between June 1966 and December 1967. After the remodeling, it was renamed Menlo Park Mall.

The original center was anchored by Bamberger's, Montgomery Ward (opened May 1960), a small, dry goods only, JCPenney, a two-level Woolworth, as well as two grocery stores: ShopRite (later a Pathmark), and Pantry Pride, later a Big Buy.

Originally a one-level structure, the fully enclosed mall (post-1967) had a lack of skylights, with only shaded windows along the sides of the ceiling. The low lighting made the interior quite dark, as was customary with interiors of malls at the time. The mall had unique flooring with patterns of orange, black, yellow and white throughout the mall.

The Montgomery Ward space was taken over by Alexander's in 1972. JCPenney moved to Woodbridge Center in 1981. Bamberger's was rebranded by Macy's in October 1986. When Alexander's went out of business in 1992, the mall was able to secure the second Nordstrom in the state of New Jersey, but changes had to be made to prepare for the opening.

Most of the mall was closed from 1990 to 1991, when it underwent a significant renovation and expansion that converted it from a single-story structure into its current two-story form. In expanding and fitting into the space, the new Menlo Park Mall was built on an angle with the vertex occurring at center court. The renovated Menlo Park Mall was also changed to have galleria style skylights, domed fountain courts, marble flooring, dramatic lighting, sculptures and a large, skylit food court featuring trees and sculptures, designed to look like a "formal garden." The new mall was designed by architecture firm RTKL Associates Inc. of Dallas Texas. Two parking decks were also added, as was a 12 Screen Cineplex Odeon movie theater which replaced the smaller Menlo Park Cinema on Route 1. Cineplex was later replaced by an AMC Dine-In Theater. Macy's was the only store to remain open during the primary expansion. Nordstrom officially opened to the public at Menlo Park Mall on September 27, 1991.

On March 9, 1997, Target Greatland opened across the street from the mall. Rainforest Cafe opened on September 17, 1998.

On January 27, 2003, The Cheesecake Factory opened its doors for the first time.

In 2014, Smashburger opened along with an upgrade to the food court.

In 2015, a renovation project was started which removed such features as the central fountain and trees. The food court's raised platform, sculptures, and trees were also removed, and the food court was renamed "Dining Pavilion."

On September 22, 2018, a Disney Junior themed kids zone opened by Nordstrom.

On June 24, 2020, GNC announced that it closed its location at Menlo Park Mall.

References

Edison, New Jersey
Simon Property Group
Shopping malls established in 1959
Shopping malls in New Jersey
Buildings and structures in Middlesex County, New Jersey
Tourist attractions in Middlesex County, New Jersey
Shopping malls in the New York metropolitan area
1959 establishments in New Jersey
U.S. Route 1